Edward Clive, 1st Earl of Powis,  (7 March 1754 – 16 May 1839), known as the Lord Clive between 1774 and 1804, was a British politician who sat in the House of Commons from 1774 to 1794 when he was raised to the peerage as Baron Clive.

Early life
Powis was the eldest son of Robert Clive, 1st Baron Clive ("Clive of India"), and  Margaret born Maskelyne. He was born at Queen Square, Bloomsbury, London, and he was educated at Eton College and Christ Church, Oxford.

Political career
Clive succeeded his father as Baron Clive of Plassey co Clare in 1774. However, as this was an Irish peerage, it did not entitle him to a seat in the British House of Lords (although it did entitle him to a seat in the Irish House of Lords). At the 1774 general election he was elected as Member of Parliament for Ludlow, a seat he held until 1794. He was a member of the Board of Agriculture in 1793.

On 13 August 1794, Clive was created Baron Clive, of Walcot in the County of Shropshire, in the Peerage of Great Britain, and consequently took his seat in the House of Lords. Almost certainly this was a belated act of contrition by the Crown for the lack of recognition to his father. Clive had a distinguished career in India where he was Governor of Madras from 1798 to 1803, returning home to the thanks of both Houses of Parliament.

On 14 May 1804, he was further created Baron Powis of Powis Castle co Montgomery, Baron Herbert of Chirbury co. Salop, Viscount Clive of Ludlow co. Salop, and Earl of Powis co. Montgomery, a revival of the title which had become extinct on the death of his brother-in-law, George Herbert, 2nd Earl of Powis, in 1801.

Edward Clive also served as Lord Lieutenant of Shropshire from 1775 to 1798 and from 1804 to 1839 and as Lord Lieutenant of Montgomeryshire from 1804 to 1830. He was Recorder of the boroughs of Shrewsbury in 1775, and Ludlow in 1801.

He was colonel of the Shropshire Militia in 1775 and of the South Shropshire Militia in 1809; along with the other militia colonels he was granted brevet rank as colonel in the British Army in 1794.

Family
Before his elevation to the Earldom of Powis, he married Lady Henrietta Herbert, daughter of Henry Herbert, 1st Earl of Powis, in 1784. Their children were:

 Lady Henrietta Antonia Herbert (d. 1835); married Sir Watkin Williams-Wynn, 5th Baronet.
 Edward Herbert, 2nd Earl of Powis (1785–1848)
 Lady Charlotte Florentia Herbert (1787–1866); married Hugh Percy, 3rd Duke of Northumberland, and was the governess of the future Queen Victoria.
 Robert Henry Clive (1798–1854); a politician.

Lord Powis lived at Walcot Hall, an estate purchased by his father from the Walcot family in 1764.

Lady Powis died on 3 June 1830, aged 71. Lord Powis survived her by nine years and died at his London home, 45 Berkeley Square, on 16 May 1839, aged 85.  He was buried at Bromfield Parish Church, near his Oakly Park property. His obituary in the Annual Register calls him:

Remarkable for his physical vigour, and though he spent some years in India and lived freely, he might be seen, when about eighty, digging in his garden at six o'clock in the morning in his shirt sleeves.  He was apparently well the day before his death.

References

External links

|-

|-

1754 births
1839 deaths
Alumni of Christ Church, Oxford
Clive, Edward Clive, 2nd Baron
Clive, Edward Clive, 2nd Baron
Clive, Edward Clive, 2nd Baron
Clive, Edward Clive, 2nd Baron
Earls of Powis
Peers of Great Britain created by George III
Lord-Lieutenants of Montgomeryshire
Lord-Lieutenants of Shropshire
Lords Lieutenant of Ireland
Clive, Edward Clive, 2nd Baron
Members of the Privy Council of the United Kingdom
Edward
People educated at Eton College